The Yashin Trophy is an association football award presented annually by France Football to the best performing goalkeeper.

The award is named after former Soviet Union goalkeeper Lev Yashin, and the winner is selected by former Ballon d'Or winners since its creation in 2019.

Winners

Wins by player

Wins by country

Wins by club

References 

European football trophies and awards
France Football awards
Awards established in 2019
Ballon d'Or